Lachowice  is a village in Sucha County, Lesser Poland Voivodeship, in southern Poland. It is a sołectwo within the administrative district called Gmina Stryszawa.

The village has a population of 2,200.

References

Lachowice